Alexander Thistlethwayte (1636–1716) of Winterslow, Wiltshire was the member of the Parliament of England for Salisbury for the parliaments of March and October 1679, and 1681.

References 

Members of Parliament for Salisbury
English MPs 1679
1636 births
1716 deaths
English MPs 1681